The 1994 Idaho gubernatorial election was held on November 8 to select the governor of the U.S. state of Idaho. Democratic incumbent Cecil Andrus chose not to seek reelection after a total of fourteen years in office. Former state senator and Republican Party chair Phil Batt rallied to defeat Democratic attorney general Larry Echo Hawk;  the victory was the first by a Republican in 28 years.

Republican primary
Lieutenant governor Butch Otter was considered a likely candidate for governor, but decided to run for re-election in 1994 after being arrested for driving under the influence in August 1992. Otter went on to be elected governor in 2006, though he publicly admitted that the incident could have ended his political career. Batt was the Republican nominee twelve years earlier, but narrowly lost to incumbent John Evans.

Candidates
Phil Batt, former lieutenant governor
Larry Eastland
Chuck Winder, naval aviator
Doug Dorn

Results

Democratic primary
The statewide primary was held on May 24, 1994.

Candidates

Larry Echo Hawk, Attorney General of Idaho
Ron Beitelspacher, Idaho State Senator
David W. Sheperd

Results

General election

Campaign
Although at first many thought Echo Hawk would win the election and become the first Native American governor in the United States, Batt prevailed with an aggressive campaign and with the help of a Republican tide that was especially powerful in Idaho in 1994, snapping a streak of 28 years of Democratic victories.

Results

See also
Governor of Idaho
List of governors of Idaho
Idaho gubernatorial elections

References

External links
Idaho General Election Results November 8, 1994

1994
1994 United States gubernatorial elections
Gubernatorial